The Constitution of Prussia was adopted on 31 January 1850, and amended in the following years. This constitution was far less liberal than the federal constitution of the German Empire.

The government was not responsible to the Abgeordnetenhaus (lower chamber), whose powers were small and whose members were elected by a Prussian three-class suffrage system based on tax-paying ability. The Herrenhaus (upper chamber) was largely controlled by the conservative Junkers, who held immense tracts of generally poor land east of the Elbe (particularly in East Prussia). Endowed with little money and much pride, they had continued to form the officer corps of the Prussian Army. The rising industrialists, notably the great mine owners and steel magnates of Rhenish and Westphalia, although their interests were often opposed to those of the Junkers, exerted an equally reactionary influence on politics. The "potential power of the Prusso-German crown was vast" (Christopher Clarke, Kaiser Wilhelm II). For example, the monarch held the power to nominate and dismiss Prussian officials (as well as federal ones). His assent was also necessary for legislation to pass into law, as well as Commander-in-Chief of the armed forces and coming with this, the power to appoint or dismiss officials during peacetime. In a decree, William I of Prussia, stated that acts of the Prussian government were those of the King of Prussia, "from whose decision they originate, and who expresses his opinion and will constitutionally through them".

Transformation
Prussia was transformed from a duchy to a kingdom on 18 January 1701 by Elector Frederick III of Brandenburg who declared himself King in Prussia. He was allowed to be king only in the Prussian kingdom to avoid offending the Holy Roman Emperor Leopold I, who had power over most of his lands. Brandenburg was treated as a separate state from the Prussian Kingdom. The state of Brandenburg was later considered as part of Prussia although most of its territories lay outside Prussia proper. The kingdom grew magnificently during King Frederick I reign.

The Kingdom
King Frederick II of Prussia succeeded Frederick I's son Frederick William. He considered himself as the first true servant of Prussia. He promoted the development of Prussia such as the Oderbruch. He also developed the military structure of the state and got involved in the First Partition of Poland with Austria and Russia. Frederick the Great became known as the first “King of Prussia.” During his reign, he practiced enlightened absolutism. He was a fair king who introduced the civil code and abolished torture. He applied the principle that the monarchy should not go interfere with the justice system.

Crisis

In 1847, Prussia experienced crisis common to all German states. There were catastrophic crop failures, bread riots, serious business recession and government incapability. In 1848, drastic changes in the Prussian kingdom began. Many bloody revolutions forced Frederick William IV to make transformations in the government. New ministers occupied a middle position in an unstable government structure. The King was gradually recovering power over his states with the aid of a set of advisers called the Kamarilla. An elected national assembly was challenging the reemergence of the King's power. There began a tug of war in the power over the governance of the Kingdom between the king and the Prussian National Assembly. After a series of cabinet reshuffles and government transformations, a new constitution was approved. It excluded a systematic democratic influence, which shows that revolutionary movements had little power. However, the king had lost his absolute powers. A new constitution was adopted which made Prussia a constitutional state, one of the most significant achievements of the revolutions.

Prussia's Constitution
 In 1850, a new constitution was adopted by the Kingdom of Prussia. This was improved in the consequent years. The newly adopted constitution was less liberal compared with the federal constitution of the rest of the German empire. The Prussian constitution also included the Landtag or "State Diet". They had less power than the rest of the constitutional members. They were elected by a suffrage system based on the amount of tax paid. The constitution also included a Herrenhaus, ("House of Lords") which was mostly controlled by the conservative Junkers. They held large areas of poor land in the east of Elbe in the east of Prussia. They formed the officer corps of the army of Prussia. The Rhenish and Westphalian rising industrialists also had equal political power with the Junkers.
 In 1918, the Prussian constitution became liberalised after it was transformed into a republic. The Junkers lost most of their lands and the influence of Rhenish industrialist extended throughout the land. In 1932, Franz von Papen was appointed German chancellor and also became commissioner for Prussia. In 1932, he suspended the Landtag and ousted Otto Braun who was then the Social Democratic Premier of Prussia. Luckentheorie is a gap in the Prussian constitution after the 1848 revolutions. Otto von Bismarck exploited this to solve the crisis over taxes for military reforms.

Free State of Prussia

The Prussian constitution was liberalized after Prussia became a republic in 1918, and the Junkers lost many of their estates through the cession of Prussian territory to Poland. However, both the Junkers and the Rhenish industrialists continued to exert much power behind the scenes, and when Franz von Papen became German chancellor in 1932 and commissioner for Prussia, they came into their own. In July, 1932, Papen suspended the Prussian parliament and ousted the Social Democrat Otto Braun, who had been premier of Prussia (with brief interruptions) from 1920.

See also
Lückentheorie

Notes

References
 Büsch, Otto, ed. Friedrich Wilhelm IV in seiner Zeit: Beiträge eines Colloquiums, Berlin: Colloquium Verlag, 1987.
 Hoffmann, Jürgen. Das Ministerium Camphausen- Hansemann: Zur Politik der preussischen Bourgeoisie in der Revolution von 1848, Berlin: Akademie Verlag, 1981.

External links
English Text
Text of the Constitution 

Prussian law
Prussia
1850 in law
1850 in Prussia
Constitutions of Germany
Politics of Prussia
1850 in Germany